Hemmatabad (also Romanized as Hemmatābād) is a village in the Central District of Mashhad County, Razavi Khorasan Province, Iran.In 2015, its population was about 25,000

References 

Populated places in Mashhad County